Arthur Carlyne Niven Dixey (1889 – 25 May 1954) was a British Member of Parliament.

Dixey was educated at Manchester Grammar School  and became a solicitor in 1913.  He was a supporter of the Conservative Party, and stood for the party in Penrith and Cockermouth at the 1923 United Kingdom general election.  He won the seat, and served until the 1935 United Kingdom general election, when he stood down.

References

1889 births
1954 deaths
Conservative Party (UK) MPs for English constituencies
People educated at Manchester Grammar School
UK MPs 1923–1924
UK MPs 1924–1929
UK MPs 1929–1931
UK MPs 1931–1935